Dedov, and its feminine form Dedova, is a Russian surname that has been borne by, among others:

Alexandru Dedov (born 1989), Moldovan footballer
Alexey Dedov (born 1960), Russian diplomat
Eva Dedova (born 1992), Kazakh Turkish actress
Valentina Dedova, married name of Russian diver Valentina Chumicheva (1931–2021)

See also
Dědová, a village in the Czech Republic

Russian-language surnames